Rana Niejta and Rana Niejte are Ume Sami names on a goddess in Sami mythology. In Northern Sami she is called Rana Neida and Rana Neide (names in other Sami languages are Rana Nieda, Ruona Neida, Radien-neide and Blende).

Rana Niejta is the goddess for spring and fertility. The literal translation of the name Rana is «the green» or «the green, fertile fields». The name Rana Niejta can freely be translated as «the daughter of earth». According to Sami mythology, she made the mountains turned southwards green, so that hungry reindeer had enough food.

Sala Niejta and Rana Niejta
The Finnish linguist Otto Donner described in his translation of Sámi poems into German and Finnish in 1876 how Sala Niejta "daughter of the Sun", Rana Niejta and Saivo Niejta "daughter of the underworld" often were mentioned together in sami poetry, and sometimes were confused with each other by outsiders without personal knowledge of Sámi mythology:

However, older sources from 1700 clearly shows that they are three different goddesses. Sala Niejta had the power to end the snow and the cold, while Rana Niejta made it possible for trees and herbs to grow and flourish anew every year. Rana Niejta thus represents the recreation of the spring.

The Samis considered the Sun as  Sala Niejta and Rana Niejta were two different goddesses, which, together with

The municipality of Rana, Norway

Some also consider her name as the origin of the name of the municipality of Rana in Norway.

In 1971, a bronze statue depicting Rana-Niejta was raised in the park beneath the shopping centre LA Meyer in Mo i Rana. The statue was made by the artist Arne Durban, and financed by Den Norske Bank (DNB, «The Norwegian Bank») in 1970 in connection with its 25-years anniversary. It was delivered to Rana municipality on November 19, 1970. In 2003, a similar statue was moved from DNB to Nordlandsbanken («Bank of Nordland») in Rana after the process of amalgamating the two banks.

References

Literature
 [Sckanke NS-2] Hans Sckanke: Epitomes Historiae Missionis Lapponica. Pars Prima. Anlagende de Norske Lappers Hedendom og Superstitioner, utgitt av Martha Brock Utne og O. Solberg i Finnmark omkring 1700. Aktstykker og oversikter, Nordnorske Samlinger, Etnografisk museum, Universitet i Oslo, A.W. Brøggers boktrykkeri, 1938, bind 2, pp. 175–256
 Bo Lundmark: Bæi'vi mánno nástit (Ume Sami) = Sol- och månkult samt astrala och celesta föreställningar bland samerna (Swedish) [The Sun and the Moon cult and Celestial and Astral concepts among the Saamis]), Acta Bothniensia Occidentalis, Skrifter i västerbottnisk kulturhistoria, Umeå, Västerbottens museum, 1982

Sámi goddesses
Fertility goddesses
Spring (season)